Vaidatoniai (formerly) is a village in Kėdainiai district municipality, in Kaunas County, in central Lithuania. According to the 2011 census, the village has a population of 53 people. It is located 7 km from Kėdainiai, by the Kruostas river, nearby the Kalnaberžė Forest. There are a cemetery, former school in Vaidatoniai, also a hillfort next to Mociūnai village.

History
At the end of the 19th century Vaidatoniai was a property of Dotnuva Manor.

Demography

Images

References

Villages in Kaunas County
Kėdainiai District Municipality